Led Zeppelin's Spring 1969 North American Tour was the second concert tour of North America by the English rock band. The tour commenced on 18 April and concluded on 31 May 1969.

By this point in time, Led Zeppelin's popularity was such that the group had reached top billing, sharing that honour for some of their gigs with established acts such as Julie Driscoll, Delaney & Bonnie and Three Dog Night. They were now receiving four times the money that they had previously commanded on their first tour of America just a few months earlier. Also, the band for some of its performances was one of the first groups to give single bill concerts without an opening act. However, for the band's concert at Columbia, Maryland, on 25 May, manager Peter Grant agreed for Led Zeppelin to receive second billing in support of The Who. This was the only time that these two English bands ever performed on the same bill.

During this tour the band took time out to record tracks at various recording studios for their forthcoming album, Led Zeppelin II. Many of the tracks were later mixed down by Eddie Kramer at A&R Studios, New York City.

It was during this period that Led Zeppelin guitarist Jimmy Page switched from using his Telecaster to his signature Gibson Les Paul, whilst also incorporating the use of Marshall amplifiers.

Tour set list
The fairly typical set list for the tour was:

"Train Kept A-Rollin' " (Bradshaw, Kay, Mann)
"I Can't Quit You Baby" (Dixon)
"Dazed and Confused" (Page)
"As Long As I Have You" (Mimms) (dropped after 24 May)
"Killing Floor" (Wolf)
"White Summer"/"Black Mountain Side" (Page)
"Sitting And Thinking" (Guy) (on 27 April only)
"Babe I'm Gonna Leave You" (Bredon, Page, Plant)
"You Shook Me" (Dixon, Lenoir)
"How Many More Times" (Bonham, Jones, Page)
"Communication Breakdown" (Bonham, Jones, Page)
"Pat's Delight" (Bonham)
"Whole Lotta Love" (Bonham, Dixon, Jones, Page, Plant) (on 26 April, 11 May, and 25 May only)
There were some set list substitutions, variations, and order switches during the tour.

Tour dates

References

External links
Comprehensive archive of known concert appearances by Led Zeppelin (official website)
Led Zeppelin concert setlists

Sources
Lewis, Dave and Pallett, Simon (1997) Led Zeppelin: The Concert File, London: Omnibus Press. .

Led Zeppelin concert tours
1969 concert tours
1969 in North America